Lycidola batesi is a species of beetle in the family Cerambycidae. It was described by Per Olof Christopher Aurivillius in 1923. It is known from Bolivia and Brazil.

References

Hemilophini
Beetles described in 1923